Duncan Gray was 7th Bishop of Mississippi, consecrated in 1974.

Duncan Gray may also refer to:
Duncan Montgomery Gray Sr. (1898–1966), 5th Bishop of Mississippi, consecrated in 1942
Duncan Montgomery Gray III, 9th Bishop of Mississippi